Bigmouth may refer to:

 "Bigmouth", a song by Underworld
 Bigmouth, an ogre in The Smurfs comics and animated cartoon series

Marine life
 Bigmouth buffalo, fish
 Bigmouth goby, fish
 Bigmouth skate, fish
 Bigmouth rocksnail, snail

See also
 
 
 "Bigmouth Strikes Again", a 1986 alternative rock song by The Smiths
 Big Mouth (disambiguation)